Kublibin may refer to:
 Ivan Kulibin (1735–1818), Russian mechanic and inventor
 5809 Kulibin, an asteroid